No. 145 Wing RAF was a formation of the Royal Air Force during the Second World War. It comprised No. 341 Squadron RAF, No. 74 Squadron RAF, No. 329 Squadron RAF, No. 345 Squadron RAF and No. 575 Squadron RAF.

See also
 List of Wings of the Royal Air Force

References

Wings of the Royal Air Force in the Second World War
Royal Air Force wings